The 1837 Maine gubernatorial election took place on September 11, 1837. Incumbent Democratic Governor Robert P. Dunlap did not run for re-election.

Whig candidate Edward Kent defeated Democratic candidate Gorham Parks.

Results

References

Gubernatorial
1837
Maine
September 1837 events